"Break Me" is the second single by the singer Jewel, released from her 2002 album This Way. It was a minor hit on the New Zealand and Dutch singles chart, peaking at numbers 47 and 95, respectively. It reached number 28 on the Billboard Adult Top 40 chart in the U.S., and hit number 105 in the UK.

The video for the single featured special effects and was based on the War on Terror in Afghanistan. It was played heavily on VH1 during the spring and summer of 2002.

Like the majority of Jewel's singles, "Break Me" was re-worked for radio release.  The "Radio Remix" contained new vocals and arrangement.

Chart positions

References

2001 songs
Jewel (singer) songs
Songs written by Jewel (singer)
Atlantic Records singles
2002 singles
Pop ballads
2000s ballads